The Jirón de la Unión, or Union Street, is a pedestrian street located in the Historic Centre of Lima, part of the capital of Peru. For many decades it was the most important boulevards of the city, often described as the most aristocratic, where many of the most affluent citizens of the city and most powerful men around the world would meet. Subsequently, with the deterioration of the center of Lima, the Jirón de la Unión lost its aristocratic character and became completely commercialized.

History
The Jirón de la Unión was built by Francisco Pizarro in 1535 the year of the foundation of Lima. It is located on the western side of the Plaza de Armas. It was not until the early 20th century however, that it was given its current name.

In 1535, The founder of Lima, Francisco Pizarro, designated a lot on this street to contain the City Hall; the current city hall still retains that same location. It is also one of the roads that surrounds the Palace of Government of Peru.

In 1862, with the adoption of a new system of nomenclature, the street ceased to be the axis on which the city was planned on. Thus, streets intersecting with the Jirón de la Unión had two separate names, one for their west side and another for the east.

At the start of the republican era, the Jirón de la Unión developed various pubs and restaurants as well as imported goods stores and jewelers. This caused upper-class Limans to frequent this roadway. Until the 1950s, the term irse a jironear was used when coming to the street in dress clothing. At this time, citizens of Lima at the most distinguished cultural, political, artistic and social levels could be found in the street's various cafés. As Peruvian writer Abraham Valdelomar once said, "Peru is Lima, Lima is the Jirón de la Unión, the Jirón de la Unión is the Palais Concert, and I am the Palais Concert". This phrase well reflects the impact this street had on the economic and social aspects of the city's daily life.

In the 1970s, the third through ninth blocks of the street were restricted solely for pedestrian use. In the 1980s, the Historic Centre of Lima suffered through a period of decadence in which the economic recession and the increase of crime drove away visitors. At this time, the Jirón was converted into a commercial emporium with a great quantity of abandoned store property and a large number of street sellers. It was not until the next decade until the reorganization of the historic center took place at the orders of the mayor Alberto Andrade Carmona which allowed the Jirón to reactivate its economy.

Currently, the Jirón de la Unión has returned to being a commercial center; however, it has long lost its aristocratic character. The last change that has been made is the demolition of the concrete benches placed in the 1970s that were built with the intent to pedestrianize the road. These have been replaced with new benches inscribed with the coat of arms of each of the different departments of Peru.

Old names for the Jirón de la Unión
From the foundation of Lima, and until 1862, streets had a different name for each individual block. In this sense, one avenue in reality was made up of a variety of different streets. For this reason, before it was called the Jirón de la Unión, each of its eleven blocks had a different name.

Block 1: named Puente de Piedra for the bridge that was built there and which unites downtown Lima with the Rimac District.
Block 2: named Palace for the Palace of Government of Peru which is located on this block
Block 3: named Portal of the Scribes as the city hall was located on this block as well as the scribes offices during the Viceroyalty of Peru.
Block 4: named Mercaderes for the large amount of commerce conducted on this street
Block 5: named Espaderos for the various establishments for the fabrication and sale of swords and other knives which, in the 17th century, existed on this block.
Block 6: named La Merced for the Church of La Merced which is located on this block
Block 7: named Baquijano. Until the end of the 18th century, this block was called Gurmendi because the estate of Don Bernardo de Gurmendi, who was a member of the king's court, was located on this block. In 1730 it was renamed Baquijano because the manor of the don Juan Bautista de Baquijano y Urigoen was erected there
Block 8: named Boza because the house of the Marquese of Boza was located there
Block 9: named Plaza Micheo for the plaza located there
Block 10:  named Belen. In 1613 this block was named Paula Piraldo, whose estate occupied this location. In 1842, the land was sold to the monks of the Heart of Jesus and Maria who established the Belen School at this location
Block 11: Named Juan Simon. Occupied what constituted as the city limit and intersected with the Lima City Walls. It was named for Juan Simon, a land owner

Route
The Jirón de la Unión begins its route at the Rimac river. The Puente de Piedra, also known as the Puente Trujillo as it is a continuation of Trujillo Street in the Rimac District, is considered part of the Jirón and is one of the oldest and most important bridges which cross the river. The eastern wall of the Government Palace is located on the west side of the second block of the Jirón. Meanwhile, the Passage of the Post is located on the east side and the Post Office is located there as well. The Park of the Flag is located at the end of this block where a statue of Francisco Pizarro, donated by Spain, was previously located. The mayor, Luis Castañeda Lossio, removed the statue and transferred it to the Lima City Walls Park. To replace it, he ordered a fountain be built with the addition of a flag of Peru.

The Plaza de Armas of Lima is located on the third block accompanied by palaces of City Hall and the Club de la Unión. The Santa Rosa Passage intersects this block which divides both palaces and where several restaurants and a museum are located. On the fourth block, the street becomes exclusively pedestrian and various clothing and footwear shops can be found. On the fifth block the department store Saga Falabella is located.

The Cathedral of La Merced is located on the sixth block as well as the smaller Plazoleta de La Merced church, where in 1821, José de San Martín declared the Independence of Peru, which is commemorated by a bronze statue. A monument to the former Peruvian president Ramón Castilla is located on the square. On the same square, a plaque commemorates Fernando Belaúnde Terry's march of protest against the National Jury of Elections, which did not register his candidacy for the presidency until sixteen days before the national elections. The block ends with the Interbank corporate headquarters located in an early republic building. A Saga Falabella department store is also located on this block.

After the intersection with Emancipation Avenue, the seventh block is the location of the since-demolished Palais Concert. After this block, the Jirón is made up of casinos and restaurants. The ninth block his home to a Cineplanet and the commercial galleries of Via Vento and Boza, which are deteriorated and semi-vacant. The first escalators of Peru were built at Boza in the 1960s. On this block tattoo parlors and piercing shops begin to appear more frequently. Previously this was the location of the headquarters of the newspaper La Prensa until it was closed down in the 1980s.

The ninth block borders the eastern side of the Plaza San Martin and passes by the Club Nacional and the Gran Hotel Bolívar.  There are bureaus de change located on the northeastern corner of the plaza.

The tenth and eleventh blocks are the least traversed of any of the other blocks, and there are a greater number of restaurants and travel agencies. The Rimac Building is located on the last block of the Jirón de la Unión marking the beginning of Roosevelt Avenue to the east, Bolivia Avenue to the west, and the commencement of the Paseo de la República expressway and Paseo de los Héroes Navales.

See also
Historic Centre of Lima
Downtown Lima

References
  Bromley, Juan. Las viejas calles de Lima. Lima: Municipalidad Metropolitana de Lima. Gerencia de Educación, Cultura y Deportes. Edilibros; 2005.

External links
  "Nueva forma de jironear por la Unión" newspaper article by El Comercio

Union
Pedestrian malls